Nico Lehto is a Finnish ice hockey defenceman who currently plays professionally in Finland for Oulun Kärpät of the SM-liiga.

References

External links

Living people
Oulun Kärpät players
Finnish ice hockey defencemen
Year of birth missing (living people)